Hitaffer v. Argonne Co., 183 F.2d 811 (D.C. Cir. 1950), was a case decided by the D.C. Circuit that first recognized a wife's right to bring a cause of action for loss of consortium.

The plaintiff's husband had been injured at work, and had received compensation, however his injuries had left the married couple unable to enjoy sexual relations. The wife filed for additional damages on grounds of loss of consortium, but the defendant argued that a wife could not suffer loss of consortium.

References

External links
 

1950 in United States case law
United States Court of Appeals for the District of Columbia Circuit cases
United States tort case law